Palaemonella is a genus of shrimp in the family Palaemonidae, containing the following species:

Palaemonella aliska Marin, 2008
Palaemonella asymmetrica Holthuis, 1951
Palaemonella atlantica Holthuis, 1951
Palaemonella burnsi Holthuis, 1973
Palaemonella crosnieri Bruce, 1978
Palaemonella dijonesae Bruce, 2010
Palaemonella disalvoi Fransen, 1987
Palaemonella dolichodactylus Bruce, 1991
Palaemonella foresti Bruce, 2002
Palaemonella hachijo Okuno, 1999
Palaemonella holmesi (Nobili, 1907)
Palaemonella komaii Li & Bruce, 2006
Palaemonella lata Kemp, 1922
Palaemonella longidactylus Hayashi, 2009
Palaemonella maziwi Bruce, 2002
Palaemonella meteorae Bruce, 2008
Palaemonella pottsi (Borradaile, 1915)
Palaemonella pusilla Bruce, 1975
Palaemonella rotumana (Borradaile, 1898)
Palaemonella spinulata Yokoya, 1936
Palaemonella tenuipes Dana, 1852

References

Palaemonoidea